Purdue's women's volleyball team is a varsity sports team at Purdue University. The team debuted in 1975. Carol Dewey became the first head coach. She coached for 20 years, when Joey Vrazel took over as head coach.

History

Carol Dewey era
Carol Dewey was the first coach for the women's volleyball team. The Boilermakers finished with a 15–16 record during their inaugural season. In 1979, the volleyball team became Purdue's first women's revenue sport, and Dewey became a full-time coach. Dewey coached until 1994, accumulating 20 years as head coach for the university. She finished her career with a 469–256 record.

Under Dewey, Purdue's team produced five All-Americans, six Academic All-Americans, and 39 players that received the All-Big Ten award. She also coached three teams that won Big Ten titles, in 1980, 1982, and 1985. In her ninth season as Purdue's head coach, Dewey led the Purdue team to an undefeated regular season. They finished the season ranked eighth in the country.

Joey Vrazel era

Joey Vrazel was named head coach on February 22, 1995. The team finished the 1995 season with an 8–20 record and finished ninth place in the Big Ten. She announced her resignation after her best season coaching, and caught the team and associate athletic director off guard. The former players were not as surprised, with one player expressing that she reported Vrazel's actions to the administration.

Jeff Hulsmeyer era
The third head coach of the volleyball team was Jeff Hulsmeyer, who started coaching the team in 1999. He was formerly the assistant coach for Illinois. The Boilermakers finished that season with a record of 15–14 record, finishing eighth in the Big Ten.

Dave Shondell era

Dave Shondell, the current head coach of the program, started his tenure in 2003. During his inaugural season, the attendance record was broken, averaging 1,534 fans per match.

Facilities
The team plays in Holloway Gymnasium, which has a capacity of 2,288.

Record
<small>

Conference ranking source

Note: Purdue played all of its 2020 regular-season and postseason matches in spring 2021

References

 
Big Ten Conference women's volleyball
Volleyball